Paul Ashton Delprat (born 1942) is an Australian artist and the Principal of The Julian Ashton Art School, Sydney's oldest continuous fine art school. His art is held in the National Gallery of Australia and in state, municipal and university galleries as well as numerous private collections.

Early life
Delprat was born in Sydney, Australia, grandson of Julian Howard Ashton, great grandson of Julian Ashton CBE and great grandson of Guillaume Daniel Delprat CBE. He first painted with his grandfather, Howard Ashton, and later gained a Diploma from the Julian Ashton Art School. During his student years Delprat won the Waratah Festival sculpture and drawing prizes and the Robert Le Gay Brereton Drawing Prize at the Art Gallery of New South Wales. He studied art in Paris and London.

Art and teaching career
His work is held in the collections of the National Gallery of Australia and the BHP Billiton collections. Delprat has held over twenty one man exhibitions in Sydney and has also shown in all Australian state capitals and London. Exhib. the Archibald, Sulman and Wynne prizes. 
His portrait of Banjo Paterson hangs in The Banjo Paterson Library at Sydney Grammar School, his portrait of Rodney Seaborn at the Rodney Seaborn Library, NIDA, University of New South Wales, and his portrait of Lady Paquita Mawson in the Barr Smith Library at the University of Adelaide. He taught art at the Australian International Independent School, Sydney, was appointed art master at Newington College (1967–1970) before teaching at the University of Sydney and the University of New South Wales. He became Principal of the Julian Ashton Art School in 1988. In 1990 he initiated the Scholarship Program at the school, which includes The Sir William Dobell, The John Olsen, The Brett Whiteley and The Art Express Scholarships.

Community involvement
Delprat is Patron of the Mosman Art Society Patron of Portrait Artists Australia and a former Mosman Citizen of the Year, 1996. He is an Associate of the Royal Art Society of New South Wales.
He has acted as a judge of art awards including the RAS, The Mosman Art Prize and throughout Australia. He has received an award for bushcare from Mosman Council.

Principality of Wy

In 1993 Delprat applied to Mosman Council to build a driveway over an unmade road near Wyargine Reserve, to provide access to his property. The proposal was controversial because the road reserve had been zoned environmentally-protected bushland by the Council. Delprat's plans were approved in principle, but he encountered bureaucratic errors which had to be remedied by the local council. After 11 years the Council finally rejected the application, whereupon, in a ceremony at Mosman Town Hall on 15 November 2004, the mayor, in full regalia, accepted Deplrat's declaration of the secession from Mosman of his property, styled the "Principality of Wy". Delprat has adopted the title "Prince Paul of Wy". He calls his "principality" an "ongoing creative installation".

Film work
For the 1969 motion picture Age of Consent, starring Helen Mirren and James Mason, directed by Michael Powell, and based on the novel by Norman Lindsay, Delprat created paintings, drawings and sculptures of Helen Mirren. In 1994, he created the paintings and drawings of Elle Macpherson, Portia de Rossi and Kate Fisher for Sirens, another Lindsay-inspired film, directed by John Duigan, starring Sam Neill and Hugh Grant.

Illustrator
Delprat has published illustrations in The Sydney Morning Herald, The Bulletin and Quadrant, and has illustrated numerous Penguin Books.

Bibliography
 Geoffrey Dutton – The Beach
 Cedric Flower – Aspects of Australian Erotica
 Kym Bonython – Australian Painting
 Cedric Flower – Australian Artists
 The Australian Encyclopedia
 Hilarie Lindsay – The Etchings of Paul Delprat
 Hilarie Lindsay – The Naked Gourmet
 Gavin Souter – History of Mosman
 Mosman Impressions – Mosman Municipal Council
 Shirley Perrett – Mosman Art Society The First Years

References

External links
 Principality of Wy website
 Paul Ashton Delprat website
 Julian Ashton Art School website

1942 births
Australian painters
Living people
Artists from Sydney
Staff of Newington College
Micronational leaders
Academic staff of the University of Sydney
Academic staff of the University of New South Wales

ja:ワイ公国